Burnt Cape Ecological Reserve is a nature reserve located within the town of Raleigh, Newfoundland and Labrador, and just northwest of Pistolet Bay Provincial Park. It has a large area of exposed limestone and a naturally harsh climate that permits the growth of rare dwarf flora often found in arctic and alpine areas.

References

External links

 Burnt Cape Ecological Reserve, Official web site
 List of flora, Botany Newfoundland and Labrador
 Burnt Cape Ecological Reserve, Official Brochure
 Photos of Burnt Cape Ecological Reserve

See also
 List of protected areas of Newfoundland and Labrador

Nature reserves in Newfoundland and Labrador